SS James K. Paulding was a Liberty ship built in the United States during World War II. She was named after James K. Paulding, an American writer and the 11th United States Secretary of the Navy.

Construction
James K. Paulding was laid down on 30 March 1944, under a Maritime Commission (MARCOM) contract, MC hull 2477, by the St. Johns River Shipbuilding Company, Jacksonville, Florida; she was sponsored by Mrs. M.V. McFarland, the wife of the War Shipping Administration (WSA) manager in, Jacksonville, and was launched on 12 May 1944.

History
She was allocated to the United States Navigation Company, on 30 May 1944. On 14 November 1947, she was laid up in the National Defense Reserve Fleet, Mobile, Alabama,. She was sold for scrapping, 22 September 1964, to Southern Scrap Material Co., Ltd., for $51,666.88. She was removed from the fleet on 30 October 1964.

References

Bibliography

 
 
 
 

 

Liberty ships
Ships built in Jacksonville, Florida
1944 ships
Mobile Reserve Fleet